Jimmy Powell (January 17, 1935 – January 16, 2021) was an American professional golfer who played on the PGA Tour in the 1960s and 1970s, but whose greatest success came on the Senior PGA Tour in the early to mid-1990s.

Powell was born in Dallas, Texas. He graduated from Dallas' Sunset High School and attended North Texas State University. He turned pro in 1959. He was the golf pro at Stevens Park Golf Course in Dallas during the 1980s.

Powell had limited success during the regular phase of his career, but won several official and unofficial events as a senior. In 1995, Powell became the first player to ever win both the Super Seniors competition and the Senior PGA Tour event at the same tournament. He accomplished this at the 1995 First of America Classic. He holds or shares several other Champions Tour records.

Powell lived much of his adult life in La Quinta, California. He was involved in a golf course design business with Harold Heers; the courses they have designed are mainly in the western United States.

Professional wins (15)

Other wins (4)
1968 Southern California PGA Championship
1970 Southern California PGA Championship
1991 Southern California PGA Championship

Senior PGA Tour wins (4)

*Note: The 1996 Brickyard Crossing Championship was shortened to 36 holes due to rain.

Senior PGA Tour playoff record (0–2)

Other senior wins (7)
1995 First of America Classic (Super Seniors event), Liberty Mutual Legends of Golf - Legendary Division (with Orville Moody)
1996 Liberty Mutual Legends of Golf - Legendary Division (with Orville Moody)
1999 Liberty Mutual Legends of Golf - Legendary Division (with Orville Moody)
2005 Liberty Mutual Legends of Golf - Demaret Division (with Orville Moody)
2006 Liberty Mutual Legends of Golf - Demaret Division (with Orville Moody)
2008 Liberty Mutual Legends of Golf - Demaret Division (with Al Geiberger)

References

External links

American male golfers
PGA Tour golfers
PGA Tour Champions golfers
Golf course architects
Golfers from Dallas
Golfers from California
Golfers from Nevada
Sportspeople from Riverside County, California
People from La Quinta, California
People from Incline Village, Nevada
1935 births
2021 deaths